Don Smart (born 2 December 1987) is a Jamaican footballer who currently plays for Lexington SC in USL League One as a midfielder. He is also capable of playing as a striker or outside back.

Career
In 2011, Smart joined the USL PRO side F.C. New York and made 12 appearances during the 2011 season. He then moved on to the USL Premier Development League side Fredericksburg Hotspur in 2012, scoring seven goals in just six appearances. IN 2013, he moved to the Virginia-based NPSL club RVA Football Club to play for the team during their inaugural season. During his time with the team, RVA FC won the NPSL Championship. Smart made seven appearances in the campaign, tallying nine goals.

Smart then joined Indy Eleven for their inaugural season in 2014. The Jamaican can line up on either wide side of the Indy Eleven midfield, but can also be comfortably deployed as a striker or outside back. He made his debut for the club in Indy Eleven's inaugural match against the Carolina Railhawks. He scored his first goal for the club in a 2-1 against Carolina on 12 July 2014. He would finish the 2014 season with three goals and three assists over 1,032 minutes. The 2015 season would yield similar returns as Smart finished with three goals and three assists over the course of 1,220 minutes.

Smart spent the 2018 season with National Premier Soccer League club Miami FC 2, registering a team-high seven assists during the course of the season.

In August 2018, Smart moved to Fresno FC, arriving alongside Mark Pais. He made his league debut for the club on September 9, 2018, coming on as a 46th minute substitute for Cory Brown in a 1-0 away defeat to Swope Park Rangers.

In October 2018, Smart was unveiled as the first ever signing for USL League One expansion side Forward Madison FC. He played all ninety minutes of Madison's first league fixture, a 1-0 away defeat to Chattanooga Red Wolves.

On December 15, 2020, it was announced Smart was moving to USL League One side Greenville Triumph ahead of their 2021 season.

Smart joined League One expansion side Lexington SC on January 26, 2023.

Career statistics

Club

References

External links 
 

1987 births
Living people
Jamaican footballers
Jamaican expatriate footballers
F.C. New York players
Fredericksburg Hotspur players
Indy Eleven players
Fresno FC players
Expatriate soccer players in the United States
USL Championship players
USL League Two players
North American Soccer League players
Association football forwards
Forward Madison FC players
USL League One players
Greenville Triumph SC players
Lexington SC players